Óscar Ortiz de Pinedo (November 2, 1910 – December 13, 1978) was a Cuban character actor best remembered for his numerous roles as eccentric businessmen. Married to actress Lupita Pallás, he was the father of famous comedian Jorge Ortiz de Pinedo.

Selected filmography
School for Tramps (1955)
The Sin of Being a Woman (1955)
Drop the Curtain (1955)
Look What Happened to Samson (1955)
Barefoot Sultan (1956)
The King of Mexico (1956)
Las aventuras de Pito Pérez (1957)
Rebel Without a House (1960) 
Adventures of Joselito and Tom Thumb (1960)
Three Black Angels (1960)
El analfabeto (1961)
La cigüeña distraída (1966)
Qué hombre tan sin embargo (1967)
El médico módico (1971)
La madrecita (1974)
El miedo no anda en burro (1976)

External links

Mexican male film actors
Mexican male television actors
Cuban male film actors
Cuban male television actors
1910 births
1978 deaths
Cuban emigrants to Mexico
20th-century Mexican male actors